Crispin Grey-Johnson (born December 7, 1946) is a Gambian political figure. He is the current Secretary of State for Higher Education of the Gambia.

Grey-Johnson was born in Banjul. From 1997 to 1999, he was Ambassador to the United States, Brazil, and Venezuela, and High Commissioner to Canada. He presented his credentials as Ambassador to the U.S. on September 8, 1997. He then served as High Commissioner to Sierra Leone and Ambassador to Côte d'Ivoire and Liberia from 1999 to 2002. On March 12, 2002, he became the Gambia's Permanent Representative to the United Nations, serving until 2007. During this time, he served as chairman of the United Nations Commission on Population and Development.

Grey-Johnson was appointed as Secretary of State for Higher Education, Research, Science and Technology in early 2007, and he was sworn in on February 22, 2007. He was subsequently named Secretary of State for Foreign Affairs in September 2007. On March 19, 2008, he was moved to the post of Secretary of State for Higher Education.

He is married with five children as of 2002.

References

External links

1946 births
Living people
Gambian Creole people
Gambian Christians
Government ministers of the Gambia
Higher education ministers of the Gambia
Permanent Representatives of the Gambia to the United Nations
People from Banjul
High Commissioners of the Gambia to Canada
High Commissioners of the Gambia to Sierra Leone
Ambassadors of the Gambia to the United States
Ambassadors of the Gambia to Brazil
Ambassadors of the Gambia to Venezuela
Ambassadors of the Gambia to Liberia
Ambassadors of the Gambia to Ivory Coast